The 2002 Kilkenny Senior Hurling Championship was the 108th staging of the Kilkenny Senior Hurling Championship since its establishment by the Kilkenny County Board.

O'Loughlin Gaels were the defending champions.

On 27 October 2002, Young Irelands won the title after a 3–14 to 1–15 defeat of Dunnamaggin in the final at Nowlan Park. It was their second championship title overall and their first title in six championship seasons. It remains their last championship triumph.

Team changes

To Championship

Promoted from the Kilkenny Intermediate Hurling Championship
 Mullinavat

From Championship

Relegated to the Kilkenny Intermediate Hurling Championship
 John Locke's

Results

First round

Relegation play-off

Quarter-finals

Semi-finals

Final

Championship statistics

Top scorers

Overall

Single game

Championship statistics

Miscellaneous

 The final was originally scheduled for 20 October 2002, however, a waterlogged Nowlan Park resulted in a postponement.

References

Kilkenny Senior Hurling Championship
Kilkenny Senior Hurling Championship